Antoine Bennett (born November 29, 1967) is a former American football defensive back. He played for the Cincinnati Bengals from 1991 to 1992.

References

1967 births
Living people
Players of American football from Miami
American football defensive backs
Florida A&M Rattlers football players
Cincinnati Bengals players